Nature's Best 2 is a two-disc compilation album of 35 New Zealand popular music songs, numbers 31-65 on the APRA 75th Anniversary Top 100 New Zealand Songs of All Time. See Nature's Best for more information on the selection process of this list.

Nature's Best 2 was released as part of a Nature's Best Box Set on 29 November 2005.

Track listing

Disc one
"Outlook For Thursday" – DD Smash (Dave Dobbyn/DD Smash, 1983)
"Down In Splendour" – Straitjacket Fits (Andrew Brough, 1990)
"Better Be Home Soon" – Crowded House (Neil Finn, 1988)
"How Bizarre" – OMC (Alan Jansson/Pauly Fuemana, 1995)
"Language" – Dave Dobbyn (Dave Dobbyn, 1994)
"Message to My Girl" – Split Enz (Neil Finn, 1984)
"Poi E" – Pātea Māori Club (Dalvanius Prime, 1984)
"Stuff And Nonsense" – Split Enz (Tim Finn, 1979)
"Venus" – The Feelers (James Reid, 1998)
"System Virtue" – Emma Paki (Emma Paki, 1993)
"Fraction Too Much Friction" – Tim Finn (Tim Finn, 1983)
"French Letter" – Herbs (Tony Fonoti/Spencer Fusimalohi/Dilworth Karaka, 1995)
"Maxine" – Sharon O'Neill (Sharon O'Neill, 1983)
"Out on the Street" – Space Waltz (Alastair Riddell, 1974)
"Slippin' Away" – Max Merritt & The Meteors (Max Merritt, 1975)
"Violent" – Stellar* (Boh Runga, 1999)
"Why Does Love Do This To Me?" – The Exponents (Jordan Luck, 1992)
"1905" – Shona Laing (Shona Laing, 1972)

Disc two
"Anchor Me" – The Mutton Birds (Don McGlashan, 1994)
"Bliss" – Th' Dudes (Dave Dobbyn/Ian Morris, 1979)
"For Today" – Netherworld Dancing Toys (Nick Sampson/Malcolm Black, 1984)
"Screems From Tha Old Plantation" – King Kapisi (Bill Urale/Kas Futialo, 2000)
"Cheryl Moana Marie" – John Rowles (John Rowles, 1969)
"Blue Day" – Mi-Sex (Murray Burns/Colin Bayley, 1985)
"Glorafilia" – Zed (Ben Campbell/Nathan King/Adrian Palmer, 1999)
"Good Morning Mr Rock 'N' Roll" – Headband (Tommy Adderley/Billy Kristian, 1972)
"History Never Repeats" – Split Enz (Neil Finn, 1981)
"In The Neighbourhood" – Sisters Underground (Alan Jansson/Hassanah Orogbu/Brenda Makaoeafi, 1994)
"Julia" – Citizen Band (Geoff Chunn, 1978)
"Pacifier" – Shihad (Karl Kippenberger/Tom Larkin/Phil Knight/Jon Toogood, 1999)
"Let's Think of Something" – Larry's Rebels (Roger Skinner, 1967)
"Bursting Through" – Bic Runga (Bic Runga, 1997)
"Liberty" – Greg Johnson (Greg Johnson, 1997)
"Sweet Disorder" – Strawpeople (Paul Casserly/Mark Tierney/Anthony Ioasa, 1994)
"Asian Paradise" – Sharon O'Neill (Sharon O'Neill, 1979)

See also
 Nature's Best
 Nature's Best 3
 More Nature
 Nature's Best DVD
 Australasian Performing Right Association
 Music of New Zealand
 New Zealand rock

Nature's Best
Sony Music New Zealand albums
2002 compilation albums
Sony Music New Zealand compilation albums